Takizawa dam is a gravity dam located in Saitama prefecture in Japan. The dam serves for multipurpose including flood control, water supply and to generate hydro-electricity. The catchment area of the dam is 108.6 km2. The dam impounds about 145 ha of land when full and can store 63 million cubic meters of water. The construction of the dam was started on 1969 and completed in 2007.

References

Dams in Saitama Prefecture
2007 establishments in Japan